Florida State University has graduated a large number of athletes. This includes graduates, non-graduate former students and current students of Florida State who are notable for their achievements within athletics, sometimes before or after their time at Florida State. Other alumni can be found in the list of Florida State University alumni; notable administration, faculty, and staff can be found on the list of Florida State University faculty. Intercollegiate sports teams at Florida State are called "Seminoles", and are run by the Florida State Athletics. The Athletics program runs Florida State's Hall of Fame, which has inducted many of FSU's greatest players throughout the program's history.

As a major competitor in college athletics, Florida State University has many notable alumni including student athletes, coaches and staff members. Many of the most notable members are listed in FSU's Hall of Fame and represent all major collegiate sports. A number of FSU alumni have found success in professional sports, with 123 active alumni competing in sports including basketball, football, baseball and golf. In addition, FSU has produced three Heisman Trophy winners in Chris Weinke, Charlie Ward, and Jameis Winston. Notable Seminoles in professional golf include Brooks Koepka, back to back U.S. Open champion (2017, 2018), Jeff Sluman, and Hubert Green, and  Paul Azinger, PGA Championship(1993) and Ryder Cup Captain(2008).

American football

Heisman Trophy winners

Baseball

Basketball (men's)

Basketball (women's)

Golf

PGA

LPGA

Gymnastics

Soccer

Softball

Swimming and diving

Tennis

Track and field

Volleyball

See also

 Atlantic Coast Conference
 Osceola and Renegade
 "FSU Fight Song"
 List of Florida State University people

References

External links
 Official Florida State athletics site

Florida State University
Florida State University athletes